This is a sub-article to MorphOS.
A number of bundled applications are delivered with the operating system.

MorphOS bundled applications

References 

MorphOS bundled applications